Jonathan Wright (born 1969) is a British historian and author.

His books include The Jesuits: Missions, Myths and Histories (HarperCollins, 2004), published in the United States as God's Soldiers (Doubleday, 2004). He has recently published a book on heresy.

Wright was educated at the Universities of St Andrews and Oxford where he was awarded a doctorate in 1999. Wright reviews for numerous British and American newspapers, magazines and academic journals.

References

External links

1969 births
Living people
British historians
British writers